Ambassador of Ukraine to Cuba
Ambassador of Ukraine to Finland
Ambassador of Ukraine to Hungary
Ambassador of Ukraine to Mexico
Ambassador of Ukraine to Moldova
Ambassador of Ukraine to Peru
Ambassador of Ukraine to Sweden
Ambassador of Ukraine to the United States

List of representatives

 
Ukraine